Wuhan University School of History is a school for the study of history in Wuhan University. Established in 1913, the school is part of the Faculty of Humanities.

Majors
Undergraduate
History
Archaeology
History theories
Archaeology and Museology
Historical geography
Historical bibliology
History of particular subjects
Ancient Chinese history
Modern Chinese history
World history
Chinese culture history
Chinese economic history
International relations and diplomatic history
Regional history

References

External links
School of History

Wuhan University Faculty of Humanities